Robert Slater (October 1, 1943 – March 25, 2014) was an American author and journalist known for over two dozen books, including biographies of political and business figures such as Golda Meir, Yitzhak Rabin, George Soros, and Donald Trump.

Slater was born in Manhattan and grew up in South Orange, New Jersey. He graduated from Columbia High School in 1962 and graduated with honors from the University of Pennsylvania in 1966, with a degree in political science.  In 1967 he received a master's degree in international relations from the London School of Economics. He worked for United Press International (UPI) from 1969 to 1971 before moving to Jerusalem, where he worked for UPI until 1974; and for Time magazine in Jerusalem from 1976 to 1996. From 1987 and 1990 he was chairman of the Foreign Press Association in Israel. In his later years he was a columnist for The Jerusalem Report, and mentored young journalists at The Jerusalem Post. He lived for much of his life in Israel, and with his wife, Elinor, co-authored the books Great Jewish Women and Great Jewish Men. He died in Jerusalem on March 25, 2014, aged 70, from complications of the flu.

Books

References

1943 births
2014 deaths
American male journalists
20th-century American journalists
American biographers
Writers from New York City
Writers from Jerusalem
University of Pennsylvania alumni
Alumni of the London School of Economics
People from South Orange, New Jersey
Time (magazine) people
Historians from New York (state)
American male biographers